Ethel Clifford Rosenberg (December 25, 1915 – April 1, 2003) known professionally as Eth Clifford or Ruth Bonn Penn, was an American children's fiction writer, best known as the author of the Flatfoot Fox and Jo-Beth and Mary Rose Mysteries series.

Life and career

Clifford was taught to read in a one-room schoolhouse, and grew up an avid reader.  It was when her family moved to Philadelphia that she was able to first avail herself to the public library.  At the age of sixteen, she met her future husband, David Rosenberg, at a poetry reading in Brooklyn.  While Rosenberg was away, serving in World War II, he encouraged Clifford to begin writing, and she did so, publishing her first novel for adults in 1949. Her subsequent books were written for children, and her 1979 novel Help I'm A Prisoner in the Library! earned her the prestigious 1982 Young Hoosier Award.

Together with her husband, she founded David-Stewart Publishing company.  When co-authoring a book, the two would write under the portmanteau pen name of David Clifford.

Clifford died on April 1, 2003.

Publications

As Ruth Bonn Penn
 Mommies are for Loving (1962)
 Unusual Animals of the West (1962)
 Simply Silly (1964)

Jo-Beth and Mary Rose Mysteries
 Help I'm A Prisoner in the Library! (1979)
 The Dastardly Murder of Dirty Pete (1981)
 Just Tell Me When We're Dead! (1983)
 Scared Silly (1988)
 Never Hit a Ghost with a Baseball Bat (1993)

Harvey and Nora
 Harvey's Horrible Snake Disaster! (1984)
 Harvey's Marvelous Monkey Mystery (1987)
 Harvey's Wacky Parrot Adventure (1990)
 Harvey's Mystifying Raccoon Mix-Up (1994)

Flatfoot Fox
 Flatfoot Fox and the Case of the Missing Eye (1990)
 Flatfoot Fox and the Case of the Nosy Otter (1992)
 Flatfoot Fox and the Case of the Missing Whoooo (1994)
 Flatfoot Fox and the Case of the Bashful Beaver (1995)
 Flatfoot Fox and the Case of the Missing Schoolhouse (1997)

Other books
 Go Fight City Hall (1949)
 The Year of the Three-Legged Deer (1972)
 Burning Star (1974)
 The Wild One (1974)
 The Curse of Moonraker: A Tale of Survival (1977)
 The Rocking Chair Rebellion (1978)
 The Killer Swan (1980)
 The Strange Reincarnations of Hendrik Verloom (1982)
 The Remembering Box (1985)
 I Never Wanted to Be Famous (1986)
 Leah's Song (1987)
 I Hate Your Guts, Ben Brooster (1989)
 The Summer of the Dancing Horse (1991)
 Will Somebody Please Marry My Sister? (1992)
 Family for Sale (1996)
 Ghost School (1998)

References 

1915 births
2003 deaths
American writers
Novelists from New York (state)